Infanta Francisca Josefa Maria Xaviera() (30 January 1699 – 15 July 1736) was a Portuguese infanta (princess) and the last of eight children of King Peter II of Portugal and his second wife Marie Sophie of Neuburg.

Francisca Josefa was born and died in Lisbon. Charles Emmanuel III of Sardinia was proposed as a possible marriage for the infanta in 1720–21, but nothing came of it. She never married nor had issue and she died when she was 37 years old. She is buried at the Royal Pantheon of the Braganza Dynasty.

Ancestry

Bibliography

References 

Portuguese infantas
People from Lisbon
1699 births
1736 deaths
Burials at the Monastery of São Vicente de Fora
House of Braganza
17th-century Portuguese people
18th-century Portuguese people
17th-century Portuguese women
18th-century Portuguese women